Skyman may refer to:

Fictional characters and media
Skyman (Columbia Comics),  fictional comic book superhero
Skyman (film), a 2019 American science fiction-found footage horror film
Skyman (DC Comics), a DC Comics character
Sylvester Pemberton, a DC comics character and one of the people to be called Skyman
Skyman, a character in the manga/anime series Kinnikuman
Jacob Colby, aka Skyman, a DC comics character
Skyman, a BBC1 Radio show by Mark Radcliffe
The Skyman a 1948 Australian comic strip by Yaroslav Horak
Skyman, a comic book series by Dark Horse Comics

People
"Skyman", nickname of Philip Orin Parmelee (1887–1912), American aviator
"Skyman", stage name for Guillaume Faye
"SkyMan", nickname of a member of the Rain City Superhero Movement

Other
Skyman, a flying platform for Steadicam operators for which Garrett Brown received a Technical Academy Award
Skyman, a series of aircraft built by Austrian aircraft manufacturer Wings of Change